Hentzwill Nowellen Pedro (born 21 July 1987 in George, South Africa) is a South African rugby union player, who most recently played with the . His regular position is winger.

Career

Amateur

He started his career playing amateur club rugby for South Western Districts Premier League side Blanco. In 2012, he was a member of the side that won the competition and qualified for the final edition of the National Club Championships, before that was replaced by the SARU Community Cup.

SWD Eagles

He came on as a replacement halfway through the second half and took just ten minutes to open his account, scoring a 70th minute try for the Eagles to help them to a 58–42 victory. He made a further three substitute appearances as the Eagles reached the semi-finals of the competition.

He was utilised more during the 2014 Vodacom Cup competition, starting all eight of the SWD Eagles' matches as they reached the Quarter Finals of the competition.

References

South African rugby union players
Living people
1987 births
George
Rugby union wings
SWD Eagles players
Rugby union players from the Western Cape